Sir Robert Marney (ca. 1319 – 1400), of Layer Marney, Essex, and Kingsey, Buckinghamshire, was a 14th-century English politician.  He was the son of Sir William Marney and his wife Katherine Venables. He has been described as "disreputable local gentry" by one 21st-century historian and was accompanied John Fitzwalter, 2nd Baron FitzWalter on various violent and criminal acts in the Colchester area.

Marney was a Member of Parliament for Essex in 1369, 1371, 1376, October 1377, 1379, November 1380, October 1382, October 1383, November 1384, 1386, and January 1390.
He was a justice of the peace for Essex and involved in the suppression of the Peasants' Revolt in 1381.

See also
Robert de Marny

References

1319 births
1400 deaths
English MPs 1369
People from Colchester
People from Buckinghamshire
English knights
English MPs 1371
English MPs 1376
English MPs October 1377
English MPs 1379
English MPs November 1380
English MPs October 1382
English MPs October 1383
English MPs November 1384
English MPs 1386
English MPs January 1390